The Girl from Monaco (original title: La Fille de Monaco) is a 2008 French comedy-drama film directed by Anne Fontaine. The film stars Fabrice Luchini, Roschdy Zem, Louise Bourgoin, and Stéphane Audran.

Plot
Middle-aged and highly successful lawyer Bertrand Beauvois (Fabrice Luchini) is hired by Monaco businessman Louis Lassalle (Gilles Cohen) to defend his mother Édith Lassalle (Stéphane Audran), who has killed her former lover. Lassalle assigns a bodyguard to Beauvois, Christophe Abadi (Roschdy Zem).

Audrey Varella (Louise Bourgoin), a beautiful but highly promiscuous local TV weather girl whose previous lovers include Christophe, enamors Beauvois, hoping to make a better life with him. This despite the warnings of Christophe to Beauvois, who have formed a bond of friendship, to stay away from her.

Audrey spends all her time with Beauvois, including nights of exhausting wild sex, and Beauvois entreats Christophe to make her disappear from his life. He then continues to the court for his final plead in the Lassalle case.

After having sex with her, Christophe pushes Audrey and her scooter off the road and kills her. Beauvois willingly takes the blame. In one of the last scenes, we see Mrs. Lassalle being freed from prison after only one year of imprisonment while Beauvois remains among the inmates.

Cast
Fabrice Luchini as Bertrand Beauvois
Roschdy Zem as Christophe Abadi
Louise Bourgoin as Audrey Varella
Stéphane Audran as Édith Lassalle (Final film before her death 10 years later)
Jeanne Balibar as Hélène
Gilles Cohen as Louis Lassalle
Alexandre Steiger as Alain
Philippe Duclos as Inspector Taurand
Christophe Vandevelde as Tony

Reception
On the review aggregator website Rotten Tomatoes, The Girl from Monaco holds a 47% approval rating based on 53 reviews, with an average rating of 5.7/10. The consensus reads: "Undeniably slight, this satiric thriller suffers from an uneven tone and a relative lack of thrills, but solid performances from the cast help keep it afloat". On Metacritic, the film was reviewed by 19 critics and got a rank of 52 out of a 100, indicating "mixed or average reviews".

Awards and nominations
César Awards (France)
Nominated: Best Actor – Supporting Role (Roschdy Zem)
Nominated: Most Promising Actress (Louise Bourgoin)

References

External links

2008 films
Films set in Monaco
Films directed by Anne Fontaine
French comedy-drama films
2008 comedy-drama films
Warner Bros. films
2000s French films